William Pile may refer to:
William Pile (shipbuilder) (1822–1873), British shipbuilder
William A. Pile (1829–1889), American politician and minister from Missouri
William Pile (pastoralist) (1840–1916), owner of Polia Station, New South Wales
Sir William Pile (civil servant) (1919–1997), British civil servant